Mpakwithi is an extinct Australian Aboriginal dialect of Queensland.

Classification
Mpakwithi is generally regarded as a dialect of a broader Anguthimri language, which is part of the Northern Paman family.

Phonology

Vowels

 is found in only one word.

Mpakwithi has the most vowels of any Australian language, with 16–17. It also is the only Australian language to have nasal vowels.

Consonants
While other Anguthimri dialects and Northern Paman languages have three fricatives, Mpakwithi has a fourth, . Its origin is uncertain. This is an extremely rare sound in Australian languages.

References

Northern Paman languages